John Charles (1931–2004) was a Welsh footballer.

John Charles may also refer to:

People

Sportspeople
 John Charles (English footballer), active 1912–1924
 John Charles (footballer, born 1935) (1935–1995), Australian footballer for Fitzroy
 John Charles (footballer, born 1942), Australian footballer for Footscray
 John Charles (footballer, born 1944) (1944–2002), first black player to represent both England and West Ham Youth teams
 John Charles (American football) (1944–2019), American football cornerback and safety

Other people
 Juan Carlos I of Spain (born 1938)
 John Charles (physician) (1893–1971), British physician
 John Charles (composer) (born 1940), New Zealand composer, conductor, and orchestrator
 John Charles, Count Palatine of Gelnhausen (1638–1704), German prince
 John Leslie Charles (1892–1992), Chief Engineer for the Canadian National Railway

Others
 John Charles or Condea verticillata, a species of flowering plant in the family Lamiaceae

See also 
 
 Jack Charles (disambiguation)